Freya Gregory (born 12 January 2003) is an English professional footballer who plays as a midfielder for Aston Villa in the FA WSL.

Club career

Birmingham City 
Gregory was part of the Birmingham City academy for two seasons and broke into the first team in the 2019–20 season. On 17 November 2019, Gregory made her senior debut for Birmingham City against Brighton & Hove Albion in a 3–0 FA WSL defeat. She left Birmingham in June 2020.

Aston Villa 
On 4 July 2020, Gregory announced she was returning to Aston Villa, where she had previously been as a youth, ahead of the team's first season in the FA WSL. She scored her first WSL goal in late April 2021, in a 1–1 draw against her former club Birmingham. On 7 January 2022, Gregory joined Leicester City on loan for the remainder of the 2021–22 season.

International career 
In October 2019, Gregory was called to up to the England U17 team to play in the 2020 U17 UEFA Women's Under-17 Championship qualification games and played against Croatia, Bosnia & Herzegovina and Belgium.

Career statistics

Club

References

External links
 Profile at Birmingham City website
 
 

2003 births
Living people
English women's footballers
Women's association football midfielders
Women's Super League players
Birmingham City W.F.C. players
Aston Villa W.F.C. players
Leicester City W.F.C. players
England women's youth international footballers